Constantin Bârsan (born 16 May 1977) is a Romanian football striker. He became fourth top goalscorer of Divizia A in 2000–01 with 13 goals.

References

1977 births
Living people
Romanian footballers
FC Astra Giurgiu players
ACF Gloria Bistrița players
CSM Reșița players
FCM Câmpina players
FC Petrolul Ploiești players
CS Inter Gaz București players
CS Otopeni players
Association football forwards
Sportspeople from Craiova